Ramachandrapuram (RC PURAM) is a neighbourhood of Hyderabad, Telangana, India and also a part of Greater Hyderabad Municipal Corporation and Hyderabad Metropolitan Development Authority .previously It was a part of Erstwhile MEDAK District, it is now a part of Sangareddy district.

Demographics
 India census, Ramachandrapuram had a population of 52,586. Males constitute 52% of the population and females 48%. Ramachandrapuram has an average literacy rate of 70%, higher than the national average of 59.5%: male literacy is 75%, and female literacy is 64%. In Ramachandrapuram, 12% of the population is under 6 years of age. In Ashok Nagar Kakathiya Nagar literacy is almost 95%

References

Neighbourhoods in Hyderabad, India